Amanda Price is a Republican politician from Michigan who previously served in the Michigan House of Representatives.

Biography 
Prior to her election to the legislature, Price was a township trustee and supervisor. She is a former legislative aide, and was the public affairs manager for SemcoEnergy.

References

Living people
1956 births
Republican Party members of the Michigan House of Representatives
Women state legislators in Michigan
Politicians from Lansing, Michigan
Michigan State University alumni
Western Michigan University alumni
21st-century American politicians
21st-century American women politicians